Leon Harris (born 1961) is an American journalist and newscaster.

Leon Harris may also refer to:

 Leon Harris (footballer) (born 1958), Australian rules footballer
 Leon Harris (art director), art director